"Wizard of Odd" is the 56th broadcast episode of the second season of the animated television series Phineas and Ferb and the 103rd broadcast episode overall. It was originally broadcast on Disney Channel on September 24, 2010. In this episode, Mom says that Phineas and Ferb have to clean the house and she asks Candace to help, but she refuses and instead reads the book Mom gives her, The Wizard of Oz. Phineas and Ferb spin the house and spray it with a hose, but they spin the house too fast and accidentally knock Candace out, sending her into a Wizard of Oz-esque dream world. She journeys to "Bustopolis" under the impression the world is a simulation created by her brothers, but soon discovers that evil forces are attempting to get the boots that have grown on her feet.

Plot
Candace falls asleep while reading the Wizard of Oz. Candace is greeted by "Patchkins" (Fireside Girls) who tell her that she squashed Suzy and her boots. The Good Witch (Isabella) gives the boots to Candace, although Doofenwarlock (Doofenshmirtz) wants them. Candace wonders how to bust her brothers and the Good Witch tells her to use the yellow sidewalk before she floats away.

Candace and Perry run into Baljeet, a "nerd crow" who wants to be cool and Candace lets him go to Bustopolis.Candace flirts with a tree (Jeremy) and lets him come along. They run into an animal that is a mix of a lion, tiger, and bear (Buford). Candace asks about his wish, and even though he doesn't want anything, he goes with the group. Doofenwarlock captures Candace and Perry so he can take the red rubber boots. Perry easily gets out of his trap and asks the fairy (Major Monogram) to save Candace.

Candace throws a bucket of water onto Doofenwarlock's clothes and the group escapes as the guards are singing.

The group arrives in Bustopolis, where the wizard (Linda Flynn-Fletcher) gives Baljeet "cool" sunglasses, Buford gets a ham sandwich, and Jeremy learns that he was merely wearing a tree costume. Doofenwarlock gets the boots, but gets hit by a house. Candace asks Mom as the wizard to bust the boys, but Mom says that what the boys were doing sounds like fun and Candace should have joined them. The dream ends, and Candace is back on her bed.

Production
This episode was produced in 2009. In 2011, background painter Jill Daniels and background designer Brian Woods both won Primetime Emmy Awards for Outstanding Individual Achievement in Animation for their contributions to this episode. In Italy, this episode was titled "Divertiti Candace", Germany titled "Der Zauberer von Spotz", and Poland titled "Czarnoksiężnik" which all aired this episode before the United States. This episode has some of the most songs of any episode and is the second where all are sung by a character onscreen following "Dude, We're Getting the Band Back Together".

Reception

Ratings
This episode had 3.1 million viewers, the most since "Phineas and Ferb: Summer Belongs to You!". In the United Kingdom, it delivered 108,000 viewers when it premiered on Disney XD on October 21, 2010, the Going Live broadcast on the same day featured a skit after the episode where the programme's presenter Nathan Simpson went into the transmission area of the studio and famously said "That episode or anything Wizard of Oz related shall not be shown AGAIN on my programme! DO You understand?!?!?", this skit was repeated 10 years, 2 months and 3 days when The 1939 Metro-Goldwyn-Mayer film version starring Judy Garland was shown. The Disney Channel premiere on December 11, 2010 in the same country had 124,000 viewers.

Critical reception
Wired's GeekDad favorably reviewed the episode, praising the songs in the episode while also commenting that some of the episode's humor was aimed at adults rather than the younger viewers.

References

External links
 

Phineas and Ferb episodes
2010 American television episodes
Oz (franchise)
Parody television episodes
Parodies of films
Television episodes about dreams